Fiona Cynthia Taylor (born 29 May 1971) is an Australian windsurfer who competed in the 1992 Summer Olympics. Born in Melbourne, Taylor represented Australia in the women's Lechner event and finished in tenth place.

In the early 2000s Taylor founded a coaching company, Barakaya, and published two books. Spirit in Sport : Peak performance and the zone in sport covers her winning seven windsurfing world titles and includes interviews with 15 other World and Olympic champions, while An Olympian's Guide to Weight Loss discusses her personal weight loss experience.

References

External links
 
 
 

1971 births
Living people
Australian windsurfers
Female windsurfers
Australian female sailors (sport)
Olympic sailors of Australia
Sailors at the 1992 Summer Olympics – Lechner A-390
20th-century Australian women